The United Evangelical Church of Christ ; commonly the Unida Church, Unida Christian Church or Unida Evangelical Church) is an evangelical Protestant denomination in the Philippines founded in 1932.

History
The Church formed from the merger of six Filipino evangelical groups of Presbyterian and Methodist background, who met in Manila through the invitation of Don Toribio Teodoro, a layman and industrialist who was a member of the Iglesia Evangelica de los Cristianos Filipinos (Evangelical Church of the Filipino Christians). A church union was declared on 3 January 1932 at the Manila Grand Opera House.

In May 2012, Unida Church celebrated its 80th founding anniversary at the Cuneta Astrodome.

The denomination has since grown to 25,000 members in some 82 congregations and 60 mission churches, with churches concentrated in Metro Manila, Southern Tagalog, Bulacan, and the Bicolandia; several congregations in the Northern Philippines, Visayas and Mindanao; and overseas congregations in Canada and Qatar.

The church is a member of the World Communion of Reformed Churches. The Temple and Main Office of the UNIDA Church, known as the Unida Christian Center, is located at Silang, Cavite, Philippines.

See also
 Protestantism in the Philippines
 United Church of Christ in the Philippines

References 

Reformed denominations in the Philippines
Members of the World Communion of Reformed Churches
Evangelicalism in the Philippines
Christian organizations established in 1932
1932 establishments in the Philippines